Rowan Atkinson presents... Canned Laughter is a British one-off comedy television programme featuring Rowan Atkinson, broadcast on 8 April 1979 on ITV. Atkinson plays three roles: the nerdy Robert Box (who has been cited as an early incarnation of the Mr. Bean character, albeit involving more dialogue), his sinister boss Mr. Marshall, and would-be stand-up comic Dave Perry, as well as an uncredited role as a radio announcer. Produced by LWT, the thirty-minute episode was directed by Geoffrey Sax.

Synopsis

Act 1
The episode begins with Robert Box sleeping. He rises by the tune of a disco tune playing on his radio alarm, and then shines by the radio station jingle (leading to a clichéd advert for a deliberately unidentified product). He then heads to the mirror as he tries to figure out how to ask one woman colleague on a date. As the radio begins to play "Mr. Blue Sky" by ELO, the scene turns to Dave Perry who announces to a neighbour that he has his first major gig at a "swish (posh) restaurant" in Camden Town. Said neighbour, Mrs. Nolan has been sued for divorce by her husband after 45 years of marriage.

Still at home, Robert shaves in a rather awkward fashion. He then finds out he's late for work and eats a spoonful of instant coffee and one of sugar, and takes a sip of cream and one of water, and finally shakes himself up before leaving his flat. Meanwhile, Perry takes a bus to Sloane Square, where a sarcastic bus conductor proceeds to take a slice off a pound bill since Dave just had 15 pence instead of the 16p the conductor charged him, disbelieving the fact that Perry was in fact a comedian.

The scene then turns again to Box, who is shown running to work, tripping with a "Help the Blind" sign in the process. At work, Mr. Marshall has refused the whole office a pay increase in light of most workers chain-smoking (A co-worker then hides a cigarette on one of Robert's pockets). After the meeting, Box summons up the courage to ask Lorraine (Sue Holderness) on the date. The act ends with Robert's coat getting on fire because of the cigarette, with "Smoke Gets in Your Eyes" on the background.

Act 2
The second act begins with the "Sarraceno" restaurant pianist playing "Smoke...". The scene quickly turns to Robert and Lorraine having a conversation about the place. Then they order dinner: Box asks for "soup and beef", Lorraine makes her order in French, much to Box's dismay, as he didn't understand a word. She explains that her father was stationed in Toulouse, but Robert asks her for him, not knowing that Lorraine's dad is dead.

Then the entertainment is presented: Dave Perry. However, what he expected to be his "big break" turned out to be a series of quips, with Box being the only one laughing at his jokes, with Lorraine being increasingly annoyed. After Perry ended his routine unnoticed, Lorraine begins to tell Robert about her concern about diverse issues, such as the Third World and lemmings, among others. The waiter then goes to ask them for dinner.

Box decides to dance so to get on Lorraine's good side, but unfortunately the dance floor is comically small. The dance turns to be a disaster, with him wreaking havoc by tossing and turning his date around the restaurant, causing her to leave early. Turns out also that Mr. Marshall was also having dinner at the place, deciding to sack Robert on the spot. Despondent, the lonely and now unemployed Box is joined by the equally downtrodden Dave, who hasn't had a good night either. As the credits roll, Lorraine passes by a shop where she sees Robert instead of John Travolta, making her turn away.

Cast
Rowan Atkinson as Robert Box/Mr. Marshall/Dave Perry
Sue Holderness as Lorraine

On other works
Atkinson reprised his Robert Box character in 1982 (now named "Bernard Fripp") for a theatrical comedy featurette called Dead on Time, which in turn reused the gag of the main character tripping over a "Help the Blind" sign. The Mr. Bean episode The Trouble with Mr. Bean (1991) partially reused the electric shaver gag (with Bean's nose hairs getting stuck on the shaver, whereas Robert shaved his whole face (except his eyebrows and tongue).

Robert Box's "no coffee mug" routine later appeared in the 1992 series Funny Business, in which Atkinson played a silent comedy character called Kevin Bartholomew. The same gag would later be used again in Bean, the 1997 Mr. Bean feature film.

External links
 Canned Laughter at the Internet Movie Database

1979 British television series debuts
ITV sitcoms
Television shows written by Rowan Atkinson